Symplectic geometry is a branch of differential geometry and differential topology that studies symplectic manifolds; that is, differentiable manifolds equipped with a closed, nondegenerate 2-form. Symplectic geometry has its origins in the Hamiltonian formulation of classical mechanics where the phase space of certain classical systems takes on the structure of a symplectic manifold.

The term "symplectic", introduced by Weyl, is a calque of "complex"; previously, the "symplectic group" had been called the "line complex group". "Complex" comes from the Latin com-plexus, meaning "braided together" (co- + plexus), while symplectic comes from the corresponding Greek sym-plektikos (συμπλεκτικός); in both cases the stem comes from the Indo-European root *pleḱ-  The name reflects the deep connections between complex and symplectic structures.

By Darboux's Theorem, symplectic manifolds are isomorphic to the standard symplectic vector space locally, hence only have global (topological) invariants. "Symplectic topology," which studies global properties of symplectic manifolds, is often used interchangeably with "symplectic geometry."

Introduction
A symplectic geometry is defined on a smooth even-dimensional space that is a differentiable manifold. On this space is defined a geometric object, the symplectic 2-form, that allows for the measurement of sizes of two-dimensional objects in the space. The symplectic form in symplectic geometry plays a role analogous to that of the metric tensor in Riemannian geometry. Where the metric tensor measures lengths and angles, the symplectic form measures oriented areas.

Symplectic geometry arose from the study of classical mechanics and an example of a symplectic structure is the motion of an object in one dimension. To specify the trajectory of the object, one requires both the position q and the momentum p, which form a point (p,q) in the Euclidean plane ℝ2. In this case, the symplectic form is

and is an area form that measures the area A of a region S in the plane through integration:

The area is important because as conservative dynamical systems evolve in time, this area is invariant.

Higher dimensional symplectic geometries are defined analogously. A 2n-dimensional symplectic geometry is formed of pairs of directions
 
in a 2n-dimensional manifold along with a symplectic form

This symplectic form yields the size of a 2n-dimensional region V in the space as the sum of the areas of the projections of V onto each of the planes formed by the pairs of directions

Comparison with Riemannian geometry
Symplectic geometry has a number of similarities with and differences from Riemannian geometry, which is the study of differentiable manifolds equipped with nondegenerate, symmetric 2-tensors (called metric tensors). Unlike in the Riemannian case, symplectic manifolds have no local invariants such as curvature. This is a consequence of Darboux's theorem which states that a neighborhood of any point of a 2n-dimensional symplectic manifold is isomorphic to the standard symplectic structure on an open set of ℝ2n. Another difference with Riemannian geometry is that not every differentiable manifold need admit a symplectic form; there are certain topological restrictions. For example, every symplectic manifold is even-dimensional and orientable. Additionally, if M is a closed symplectic manifold, then the 2nd de Rham cohomology group H2(M) is nontrivial; this implies, for example, that the only n-sphere that admits a symplectic form is the 2-sphere. A parallel that one can draw between the two subjects is the analogy between geodesics in Riemannian geometry and pseudoholomorphic curves  in symplectic geometry: Geodesics are curves of shortest length (locally), while pseudoholomorphic curves are surfaces of minimal area. Both concepts play a fundamental role in their respective disciplines.

Examples and structures
Every Kähler manifold is also a symplectic manifold. Well into the 1970s, symplectic experts were unsure whether any compact non-Kähler symplectic manifolds existed, but since then many examples have been constructed (the first was due to William Thurston); in particular, Robert Gompf has shown that every finitely presented group occurs as the fundamental group of some symplectic 4-manifold, in marked contrast with the Kähler case.

Most symplectic manifolds, one can say, are not Kähler; and so do not have an integrable complex structure  compatible with the symplectic form. Mikhail Gromov, however, made the important observation that symplectic manifolds do admit an abundance of compatible almost complex structures, so that they satisfy all the axioms for a Kähler manifold except the requirement that the transition maps be holomorphic.

Gromov used the existence of almost complex structures on symplectic manifolds to develop a theory of pseudoholomorphic curves, which has led to a number of advancements in symplectic topology, including a class of symplectic invariants now known as Gromov–Witten invariants. Later, using the pseudoholomorphic curve technique Andreas Floer invented another important tool in symplectic geometry known as the Floer homology.

See also

 Contact geometry
 Geometric mechanics
 Moment map
 Poisson geometry
 Symplectic integration
 Symplectic vector space

Notes

References
 
 
 
  (An undergraduate level introduction.)
 
 
  Reprinted by Princeton University Press (1997). . .

External links